Replication protein A 32 kDa subunit is a protein that in humans is encoded by the RPA2 gene.

Interactions 

RPA2 has been shown to interact with:

 Cyclin O, 
 DNA-PKcs, 
 Ku70, 
 MEN1, 
 RPA3, 
 Replication protein A1, 
 STAT3, 
 TP53BP1 and
 Uracil-DNA glycosylase.

See also
 Single-stranded binding protein
 Replication protein A
 Replication protein A1
 Replication protein A3

References

Further reading